The Closing Ceremony of the 1980 Summer Olympics was held at 19:00 Moscow Time (UTC+3) on 3 August 1980 at the Grand Arena of the Central Lenin Stadium. It was attended by the Chairman of the Presidium of the Supreme Soviet of the USSR, Leonid Brezhnev. IOC President Lord Killanin closed the Games for the final time and passed the position on to Juan Antonio Samaranch.

As with other Olympic closing ceremonies held before and after, it was also originally planned to include the traditional handover to the next host city for the 1984 Summer Olympics, Los Angeles. However, the United States-led boycott resulted in changes to these elements, initiated by a host nation. Among them, the flag of Los Angeles was raised instead of the flag of the next host nation, the flag of the United States; the Olympic Hymn was played in place of the United States National Anthem; and the next host city presentation, featuring artistic displays of dance and theater representative of Los Angeles and the United States, was removed from the ceremony's programme.

Sequence of events
Countdown of Kremlin Clock chimes at 19:00 Moscow Time.
 Fanfare by the Herald Trumpeters: "Moscow Fanfare" by Soviet musician and composer A. Golovin
 Vertical Red flags with the emblem of the Moscow Olympics on them entered, along with marshals and linemen. The Card stunt was then showing the Moscow Olympics logo, with rays spreading from it.
Flag bearers enter the stadium.
Athletes enter the stadium.
Athletes gather in the stadium, as gymnasts and performers carrying multicoloured vertical flags enter.
Raising of the Soviet national flag, to the Soviet national anthem.
Raising of the Greek national flag, to the  Greek national anthem.
Speech by the IOC President Lord Killanin, in English.  He closes the Games, and bids for "the youth of the world to assemble four years from now in Los Angeles". This was his final Olympic message as IOC President as the position was passed on to Juan Antonio Samaranch.
Lowering of the Olympic flag and singing of the Olympic Anthem (in Greek, rather than Russian) performed by the same musical ensemble and using the same arrangement as the opening ceremony 15 days earlier.
Extinguishing of the Olympic Flame, following a depiction (at the card stunt) of a "fading light" sourced from the flame.
Exit of the Olympic flag, to the tune of Beethoven's "Ode to Joy" and amidst fireworks. The flag was raised again in Sarajevo, Yugoslavia on 8 February 1984 for the opening ceremony of the 1984 Winter Olympics.
Exit of the athletes, marshals, multicoloured flag bearers, and gymnasts. This was followed by the card stunt feature "Crying Misha" which depicts Misha crying at the same time.
Artistic performances followed the ceremony proper.
Performance by the Massed Military Bands of the Moscow Military District, Armed Forces of the USSR, conducted by the Senior Director of Music of the Armed Forces Bands Service, Major General Nikolai Mikhailov
Performance of gymnasts, acrobats and ribbon ballet dancers, eventually forming a picture frame (with the gymnasts as the frame itself, and the acrobats and dances inside it).
Giant Matryoshka dolls entered, taking places in each side of the stadium. 
Dance performance by performers representing some of the Soviet Union's ethnic groups and peoples.
The Grand Finale: Misha's head appeared on the card stunt. A giant effigy of Misha, mounted on balloons, then entered the stadium.
Following this: the singing of the finale song "Farewell, Moscow". The song was sung by Lev Leshchenko and Tatiana Ansiferova. 
The Misha effigy was then released into the sky while in the final seconds of the song as the audience gave a loud applause.
Performers waltz and dance in a farewell celebration. A fireworks display then happened around the Central Lenin Stadium grounds, the second such display during the ceremony. Afterwards, amidst the fireworks lighting up the night sky, all the performers exit with the song "Stadium of my Dreams" playing in the background with a highlights video of the Olympiad playing in the scoreboard.

Anthems
  Red Army Choir – Soviet national anthem
  Red Army Choir – Greek national anthem
  Red Army Choir and the Bolshoi Theater Chorus – Olympic Hymn

Legacy
Both the opening and closing ceremonies were shown in Yuri Ozerov's 1981 film O, Sport, You - the Peace! covering the highlights of that Olympiad.

A short clip of the 1980 Summer Olympics closing ceremony of Misha's departure was shown in the closing ceremony of the 2014 Winter Olympics, afterward the polar bear mascot blew out the 2014 Games Olympic torch and sheds a tear (in a nod to Misha's tears during the end of the 1980 Games).

References

External links

Closing Ceremony, 1980 Summer Olympics
Olympics closing ceremonies
Ceremonies in Russia